The Ann Meyers Drysdale Award is an award presented annually to the best women's basketball shooting guard in the National Collegiate Athletic Association (NCAA) Division I competition. It is named after Hall of Famer Ann Meyers Drysdale (née Meyers), the first high school player to make the United States national team and the first woman to receive a full athletic scholarship to UCLA.

Creation and selection
The Ann Meyers Drysdale Award was first presented in 2018, when WBCA and the Naismith Hall, in collaboration with ESPN, incorporated the Nancy Lieberman Award, first presented in 2000 to the top Division I women's point guard, into a new set of awards known as the "Naismith Starting Five" that are presented at the WBCA convention (except in 2020, when the convention was not held due to the coronavirus pandemic) to players at each of the five traditional basketball positions. These awards parallel a previously existing set of men's basketball positional awards also presented by the Hall. In addition to the Lieberman Award, the other three new awards are:
 Katrina McClain Power Forward Award
 Cheryl Miller Small Forward Award
 Lisa Leslie Center Award

Winners for each of the Starting Five awards are determined by a selection committee consisting of Hall of Famers, WBCA coaching members, and media, and headed by the award's namesake. Fan voting through the Hall's website is also incorporated into the selection process.

Key

Winners

Winners by school

See also
Jerry West Award – the counterpart to the Meyers Drysdale Award; given to the best men's NCAA shooting guard

References

External links
Official website

College basketball player of the year awards in the United States
College women's basketball in the United States
Sports awards honoring women
Awards established in 2018
College sports trophies and awards in the United States